Guédiawaye Department is one of the 45 departments of Senegal and one of the four making up Dakar Region on the Cap-Vert peninsula.

It comprises a single arrondissement, Guédiawaye Arrondissement, which is subdivided into 5 communes d'arrondissement :
 Ndiarème-Limamoulaye 
 Golf
 Sam-Notaire
 Wakhinane-Nimzatt
 Médina-Gounass

Population
In the census of December 2002 the population of the department was recorded as 258,370. In 2005, it was estimated at 286,989.

Departments of Senegal
Dakar Region